Tom Osander aka Tomo (born John Thomas Osander Jr. on 6 October 1966) is an American drummer, percussionist and producer. Osander co-founded seminal New York City based jam band God Street Wine. He is also associated with Damien Rice, Lisa Hannigan, and Hanna Leess.

Born in Princeton, New Jersey Osander was a member of the New York City jam band God Street Wine from 1988 to 1998, recording six albums and performing more than 1,000 shows, touring with bands such as The Allman Brothers, Bruce Hornsby and the Black Crowes.

In 1999 Osander moved to Killarney, Ireland, to briefly join the alternative, Killarney-based rock band Poor Uncle Harry. 
He began working with Damien Rice in 2000 and over the next several years recorded both the albums "O" and "9". During his time with Rice he recorded the Billie Holiday song Don't Explain with Herbie Hancock for his 2005 Possibilities album  
In the summer of 2007 he left Rice to concentrate on Lisa Hannigan's solo career, recording her first album Sea Sew in 2008 and touring with her until 2010. The album was nominated for the Mercury Music Prize in 2009.

In 2010 Osander relocated to Berlin, Germany and recorded and/or toured with various artists including Gemma Hayes, Eric Penny, Ultan Conlon and Peter Doran. 
Also in 2010 God Street Wine reformed to play several reunion shows. The band would continue to perform sporadically up to present day. These reunion shows included several dates as the "Friends" in Grateful Dead bassist Phil Lesh and Friends in January 2013.

Osander, with his partner Tanja Raab, have produced several benefit shows over the years under the name Double Donkey Productions. These include the 2004 Concert for Bam (in aid of the victims of the Stephens Day earthquake in Iran) at Vicar Street in Dublin and the 2010 Thomastown Community Kindergarten Benefit featuring Paul Noonan and Gavin Glass at the Bridgebrook Arms in Kilkenny, Ireland.

In 2014, Osander began collaborating with American singer Hanna Leess and co-produced her 2016 album Dirty Mouth Sweet Heart on PIAS/CNTCT Recordings.

See also
Lisa Hannigan
Damien Rice
God Street Wine

References

External links

American percussionists
1966 births
People from Princeton, New Jersey
Musicians from New Jersey
Living people